Mount Alexandra is a remote  mountain summit on the border of British Columbia and Alberta, Canada.

The first ascent of the mountain was made in 1902 by James Outram with guide Christian Kaufmann.
Mount Alexandra was named in 1902 by James Outram for Alexandra of Denmark.

Geology
Like other mountains in Banff National Park, Mount Alexandra is composed of sedimentary rock laid down from the Precambrian to Jurassic periods. Formed in shallow seas, this sedimentary rock was pushed east and over the top of younger rock during the Laramide orogeny.

Climate
Based on the Köppen climate classification, Mount Alexandra is located in a subarctic climate zone with cold, snowy winters, and mild summers.

References

External links
 Photo of Mt. Alexandra: Flickr

Mountains of Banff National Park
Three-thousanders of Alberta
Three-thousanders of British Columbia